Anthony Power (born 13 May 1945) is a British fencer. He competed in the team foil event at the 1972 Summer Olympics.

References

1945 births
Living people
British male fencers
Olympic fencers of Great Britain
Fencers at the 1972 Summer Olympics